William Webbe (born 1550), English critic and translator.

William Webbe may also refer to:

William Webbe alias Kellowe (by 1466 – 1523), MP for Salisbury
William Webbe (by 1499 – 1554), MP for Salisbury
William Webbe (by 1508 – c. 1547), MP for Huntingdon
William Webbe (fl. 1542), MP for Warwick
William Webbe (died 1585), MP for Salisbury
William Webbe (mayor) (died 1599), Lord Mayor of London
William Harold Webbe (1885–1965), British politician

See also
William Webb (disambiguation)